The 2014–15 Mountain West Conference men's basketball season will be the 16th season of Mountain West Conference basketball.

The defending regular season is San Diego State and tournament champions is New Mexico.

All-Conference Teams
Derrick Marks was named player of the year and Leon Rice was named coach of the year. The All-Conference teams are as follows:

First Team
G Derrick Marks, Sr., Boise State
F Larry Nance Jr., Sr., Wyoming
F. J. J. Avila, Sr., Colorado State
F Christian Wood, So., UNLV
G Marvelle Harris, Jr., Fresno State
Second Team
F James Webb III, RSo., Boise State
F Jalen Moore, So., Utah State
F A. J. West, Jr., Nevada
G/F Winston Shepard, Jr., San Diego State
F J. J. O'Brien, Sr., San Diego State
Third Team
G Daniel Bejarano, Sr., Colorado State
G Hugh Greenwood, Sr., New Mexico
G Josh Adams, Jr., Wyoming
G Aqeel Quinn, Sr., San Diego State
G Rashad Vaughn, Fr., UNLV
Honorable Mention
F David Collette, RFr., Utah State
G Patrick McCaw, Fr., UNLV
G Deshawn Delaney, Sr., New Mexico
F Stanton Kidd, Sr., Colorado State
G Rashad Muhammad, So., San Jose State
G Chris Smith, Jr., Utah State
F Marek Olesinski, Sr., Air Force

References